The 14 is a 1973 British drama film directed by David Hemmings and starring Jack Wild and June Brown. It was also released as Existence and, in the United States, as The Wild Little Bunch. Its plot, based on fact, concerns the fate of fourteen children in West London who are orphaned after the death of their single mother.

Plot
The film focuses on a family of 14 children who are left to fend for themselves when their mother (June Brown) passes away. Reg (Jack Wild), the eldest who is turning 18, is left in charge of the family until the child welfare come in and send them all to a children's home. However. Reg is always determined to fight to keep his family together no matter what.

Cast
 Jack Wild as Reg
 June Brown as The Mother
 Liz Edmiston as Sylvia
 Diana Beevers as Miss Field
 Cheryl Hall as Reena
 Anna Wing as Mrs. Booth
 John Bailey as Mr. Sanders
 Alun Armstrong as Tommy
 Keith Buckley as Mr. Whitehead
 Tony Calvin as Father Morris
 Chris Kelly as Roy (as Christian Kelly)
 Frank Gentry as Terry
 Peter Newby as Billy
 Paul Daly as Freddy
 Richard Haywood as John (as Richard Heyward)
 Malcolm Tierney as Mr. Michael

Production

Filming locations
The film was shot on location in West London and Berkshire and at Pinewood Studios, London, England.

Release
The film was entered into the 23rd Berlin International Film Festival where it won the Silver Bear.

References

External links

1973 films
1973 drama films
1973 independent films
1970s English-language films
British drama films
British independent films
Films about dysfunctional families
Films about grieving
Films about orphans
Films about poverty in the United Kingdom
Films about siblings
Films directed by David Hemmings
Films set in London
Films shot at Pinewood Studios
1970s British films